Landsting elections were held in Denmark on 21 September 1928, with the exceptions that the electors were elected on 14 September, that the candidates elected by the resigning parliament were elected on 15 August, and that the Faroese candidate was elected by the Løgting on 23 August.

Of the seven constituencies the seats elected by the resigning parliament and the seats representing constituencies number two (Copenhagen County, Frederiksborg County, Holbæk County, Sorø County, Præstø County and Maribo County), number three (Bornholm County), number five (Vejle County, Aarhus County, Skanderborg County, Ringkøbing County, Ribe County, Aabenraa County, Haderslev County, Sønderborg County and Tønder County) and number seven (the Faroe Islands).

Results

References

Elections in Denmark
Denmark
Landsting